Cristina Gómez may refer to:

 Cristina Gómez Arquer (born 1968), Spanish handball player
 Cristina Gómez (squash player) (born 1998), Spanish squash player